Evolutionary physiology is the study of the biological evolution of physiological structures and processes; that is, the manner in which the functional characteristics of individuals in a population of organisms have responded to natural selection across multiple generations during the history of the population. It is a sub-discipline of both physiology and evolutionary biology. Practitioners in the field come from a variety of backgrounds, including physiology, evolutionary biology, ecology, and genetics.

Accordingly, the range of phenotypes studied by evolutionary physiologists is broad, including life history, behavior, whole-organism performance, functional morphology, biomechanics, anatomy, classical physiology, endocrinology, biochemistry, and molecular evolution. The field is closely related to comparative physiology and environmental physiology, and its findings are a major concern of evolutionary medicine. One definition that has been offered is "the study of the physiological basis of fitness, namely, correlated evolution (including constraints and trade-offs) of physiological form and function associated with the environment, diet, homeostasis, energy management, longevity, and mortality and life history characteristics".

History
As the name implies, evolutionary physiology is the product of what were at one time two distinct scientific disciplines. According to Garland and Carter, evolutionary physiology arose in the late 1970s, following debates concerning the metabolic and thermoregulatory status of dinosaurs (see physiology of dinosaurs) and mammal-like reptiles.

This period was followed by attempts in the early 1980s to integrate quantitative genetics into evolutionary biology, which had spillover effects on other fields, such as behavioral ecology and ecophysiology. In the mid- to late 1980s, phylogenetic comparative methods started to become popular in many fields, including physiological ecology and comparative physiology. A 1987 volume titled New Directions in Ecological Physiology had little ecology but a considerable emphasis on evolutionary topics. It generated vigorous debate, and within a few years the National Science Foundation had developed a panel titled Ecological and Evolutionary Physiology.

Shortly thereafter, selection experiments and experimental evolution became increasingly common in evolutionary physiology. Macrophysiology has emerged as a sub-discipline, in which practitioners attempt to identify large-scale patterns in physiological traits (e.g. patterns of co-variation with latitude) and their ecological implications.  

More recently, the importance of a merger of evolutionary biology and physiology has been argued from the perspective of functional analyses, epigenetics, and an extended evolutionary synthesis. The growth of evolutionary physiology is also reflected in the emergence of sub-disciplines, such as evolutionary endocrinology, which addresses such hybrid questions as "What are the most common endocrine mechanisms that respond to selection on behavior or life-history traits?"

Emergent properties
As a hybrid scientific discipline, evolutionary physiology provides some unique perspectives. For example, an understanding of physiological mechanisms can help in determining whether a particular pattern of phenotypic variation or co-variation (such as an allometric relationship) represents what could possibly exist or just what selection has allowed. Similarly, a thorough knowledge of physiological mechanisms can greatly enhance understanding of possible reasons for evolutionary correlations and constraints than is possible for many of the traits typically studied by evolutionary biologists (such as morphology).

Areas of research
Important areas of current research include:
 Organismal performance as a central phenotype (e.g., measures of speed or stamina in animal locomotion)
 Role of behavior in physiological evolution
 Physiological and endocrinological basis of variation in life history traits (e.g., clutch size)
 Functional significance of molecular evolution
 Extent to which species differences are adaptive
 Physiological underpinnings of limits to geographic ranges
 Geographic variation in physiology
 Role of sexual selection in shaping physiological evolution
 Magnitude of "phylogenetic signal" in  physiological traits
 Role of pathogens and parasites in physiological evolution and immunity
 Application of optimality modeling to elucidate the degree of adaptation
 Role of phenotypic plasticity in accounting for individual, population, and species differences
 Mechanistic basis of trade-offs and constraints on evolution (e.g., putative Carrier's constraint on running and breathing)
 Limits on sustained metabolic rate
 Origin of allometric scaling relations or allometric laws (and the so-called metabolic theory of ecology)
 Individual variation (see also Individual differences psychology)
 Functional significance of biochemical polymorphisms
 Analysis of physiological variation via quantitative genetics
 Paleophysiology and the evolution of endothermy
 Human adaptational physiology
 Darwinian medicine
 Evolution of dietary antioxidants

Techniques
 Artificial selection and experimental evolution mouse wheel running video
 Genetic analyses and manipulations
 Measurement of selection in the wild 
 Phenotypic plasticity and manipulation
 Phylogenetically based comparisons
 Doubly labeled water measurements of free-living energy demands of animals

Funding and societies
In the United States, research in evolutionary physiology is funded mainly by the National Science Foundation. A number of scientific societies feature sections that encompass evolutionary physiology, including:

 American Physiological Society "integrating the life sciences from molecule to organism"
 Society for Integrative and Comparative Biology
 Society for Experimental Biology

Journals that frequently publish articles about evolutionary physiology
 American Naturalist
 Comparative Biochemistry and Physiology
 Comprehensive Physiology
 Ecology
 Evolution
 Functional Ecology
 Integrative and Comparative Biology
 Journal of Comparative Physiology
 Journal of Evolutionary Biochemistry and Physiology
 Journal of Evolutionary Biology
 Journal of Experimental Biology
 Physiological and Biochemical Zoology

See also

References

External links
 People, Labs, and Programs in Evolutionary Physiology
  Evolutionary Systems Biology - Some Important Papers
 Physiological and Biochemical Zoology Focused Collection: Trade-Offs in Ecological and Evolutionary Physiology

Physiology
Evolutionary biology